Joan Marie Embery (born June 1, 1949, in San Diego, California, United States) is an American animal and environmental advocate, notable for her appearances on television programs such as The Tonight Show Starring Johnny Carson and The Tonight Show with Jay Leno.

Career
Embery was a Trustee of the Morris Animal Foundation, a professional Fellow of the Association of Zoos and Aquariums, a member of the Advisory Board of the UC Davis School of Veterinary Medicine's  Wildlife Health Center, and a founding member the American Association of Zoo Keepers. The goodwill ambassador to the Zoological Society of San Diego (which oversees both the San Diego Zoo and San Diego Zoo Safari Park) for 32 years, she has also hosted educational series such as Animal Express, Animals of Africa, Baby Panda, and Challenges to Wildlife on public broadcasting. She has raised awareness of animals and wildlife conservation through her books, tours, projects, and appearances on television shows. 

Over the course of her decades-long career, she and her many animal ambassadors appeared nearly 70 times on The Tonight Show with Johnny Carson. According to Joan herself, however, that number is closer to 100 times, with additional appearances while Jay Leno was hosting. She was especially enjoyed by Johnny Carson and his audiences, where various animal guests included a baby elephant who could “paint”, a tarantula, a baby rhinoceros, a lion cub, and a pygmy marmoset who jumped from Joan’s arm to Johnny’s arm, up to his shoulder, then to the top of his head, before sitting quietly and urinating there, on live television. Joan said that the marmoset was “content” and “marking its territory,” given that apparently, it had its tail wrapped around Johnny Carson’s ear as well.

Television appearances
Embery appeared on The Tonight Show Starring Johnny Carson, The Tonight Show with Jay Leno, Good Morning America, CBS This Morning, The Mike Douglas Show, Live with Regis and Kathie Lee, Entertainment Tonight, ALF, The Phil Donahue Show, Newhart, Hollywood Squares, Win, Lose or Draw, The Larry Sanders Show, Mister Rogers' Neighborhood, Xuxa, Leeza, Kidsongs and PM Magazine.

Personal life
Embery studied zoology and telecommunications at SDSU before earning a BA in Communications, at Eastern Illinois University.

Marriage 
Joan Embery and Duane Pillsbury (1929 - 2020) were married almost 42 years, until his death at age 91. Embery and Pillsbury, a ranch owner, conservationist, college instructor and artist, met when she was thirty and he was fifty. The couple met through the matchmaking efforts of one of Pillsbury's two daughters, who shared with Embery a mutual interest as competitive female equestrians. During their marriage, Pillsbury always accompanied Embery on her world travels and TV appearances. Pillsbury died in 16 September 2020 due to complications after a serious fall while riding one of his horses.

Ranch 
Embery and Pillsbury made their home at Pillsbury Ranch, a  ranch in east county San Diego, home to show horses, wildlife ambassadors, the native wildlife, and personal pets. Two of her most well-known animals were a zebra, who would graze on her front lawn, and a toco toucan. The Pillsbury Land & Livestock Co. property hosted many fundraisers for civic, environmental and animal conservation groups over the years.

Equestrian interests 
In addition to being an environmental advocate, Embery is a skilled horsewoman who has won many trophies, including the areas of dressage, cutting, jumping and driving.

Honors
Embery was nominated and inducted into the San Diego County Women's Hall of Fame in 2007 by Women's Museum of California, Commission on the Status of Women, University of California, San Diego Women's Center, and San Diego State University Women's Studies.

Outstanding Celebrity Philanthropist – Rotary International, San Diego Chapter
Headliner of the Year Award – San Diego Press Club
Paul Harris Award - Rotary International
Honorary Lifetime Member – AAZK (American Association of Zookeepers)
Outstanding Documentary Personality – ON CABLE Award 1983
Excellence in Informational Programming – Cable ACE Award 1983
Living Legacy Award – Women's International 1994
Honorary Doctorate of Public Service – Eastern Illinois University 1994
Distinguished Alumna Award – Eastern Illinois University 1998
Soroptimist Honoree of Distinction 2001
Style Award – Fashion Group International, San Diego Chapter 2002
Tracks in the Sand Conservation Award – The Living Desert 2004
Communications and Leadership Award – Toastmasters International 2005
Ambassador for Wildlife Award – Miami Metro Zoo 2005
Lifetime Achievement Award – PAWS San Diego County, 2006
Legacy Award – Nonprofit Management Solutions 2006
Alumni Award – San Diego City Schools 2006
San Diego County Women’s Hall of Fame – Spirit of the Hall of Fame 2007
Outstanding Celebrity Volunteer – American Federation of Philanthropists - 2010
Conservation Medal-Zoological Society of San Diego -2011
Women of Distinction Salvation Army 2011
Cool Women – Girl Scouts of San Diego 2012
Women Who Mean Business Community Service Award – 2015

References

External links
 Official site

Questions & Answers: Joan Embery, interview with Michele Clock of The San Diego Union-Tribune
Women's Museum of California

1949 births
Living people
American environmentalists
American women environmentalists
21st-century American zoologists
People from San Diego
People from Lakeside, California
Activists from California
21st-century American women